Allamanda polyantha is an ornamental plant in the genus Allamanda of the family Apocynaceae, which is native to Brazil.

External links
 Allamanda polyantha photo

polyantha
Flora of Brazil